Igwe Okafo (born 1830–1891) was the 16th Obi of Otolo and Igwe of Nnewi kingdom. He was the traditional supreme ruler and spiritual leader in Nnewi, an Igbo city in Nigeria. He is a member of the Nnofo Royal lineage and the successor to his father Eze Ukwu. Unlike most Igbo monarchies, there were kings of Nnewi before the arrival of Europeans.

References

Igbo monarchs
Nnewi monarchs
Nigerian traditional rulers
People from Nnewi
1830 births
1891 deaths